Andraca paradisea is a moth of the family Endromidae. It is found in the Philippines (Mindanao).

The wingspan is 34–41 mm for males and 46–48 mm for females. Both the fore- and hindwings have a chestnut ground colour, with darker triangular shadows in the external fields of the forewings. There are dark brown wavy transversal fasciae and the discal spot is very small, point-like and blackish. The hindwings have lighter basal and medial areas. Adults are on wing from July to mid-January, probably in two generations per year.

References

Moths described in 2012
Andraca
Moths of the Philippines